Christoffel Philippus van der Walt (born 14 July 1989) is a South African rugby union footballer.

In 2014, it was announced that Van der Walt would join French Pro D2 side Biarritz on a two-year deal for the 2014–15 Top 14 season.

In July 2019, Van Der Walt joined Newcastle Falcons on a three-year deal.

References

1989 births
Living people
People from Raymond Mhlaba Local Municipality
Afrikaner people
South African people of Dutch descent
South African rugby union players
Rugby union flankers
Cheetahs (rugby union) players
Free State Cheetahs players
Griffons (rugby union) players
Rugby union number eights
University of the Free State alumni
Biarritz Olympique players
South African expatriate rugby union players
South African expatriate sportspeople in France
Expatriate rugby union players in France
Rugby union players from the Eastern Cape